Hajjiabad (also Romanized as Ḩājjīābād and Hājīābād; also known as Haji Abad Poshtkooh) is a village in Poshtkuh Rural District, in the Central District of Khansar County, Isfahan Province, Iran. At the 2006 census, its population was 160, in 46 families.

References 

Populated places in Khansar County